1917 in film was a particularly fruitful year for the art form, and is often cited as one of the years in the decade which contributed to the medium the most, along with 1913. 
Secondarily the year saw a limited global embrace of narrative film-making and featured innovative techniques such as continuity cutting. Primarily, the year is an American landmark, as 1917 is the first year where the narrative and visual style is typified as "Classical Hollywood".


Events
January – Panthea is released, the first film from the company that Joseph Schenck formed with his wife, Norma Talmadge, after leaving Loew's Consolidated Enterprises.
February – Buster Keaton first meets Roscoe "Fatty" Arbuckle in New York and is hired as a co-star and gag man.
April 9 – Supreme Court of the United States rule in Motion Picture Patents Co. v. Universal Film Manufacturing Co. which ends the Motion Picture Patents Company appeal and results in the end of the company.
April 23 – Release in the United States of the short The Butcher Boy, the first of Roscoe "Fatty" Arbuckle's series of films with the Comique Film Corporation, and Buster Keaton's film debut.
April 25 – Thomas Lincoln Tally, in a meeting in New York, co-founds the First National Exhibitors Circuit.
June – Thomas H. Ince and Mack Sennett leave Triangle Film Corporation following Stephen Andrew Lynch taking control.
September 13 – Release in the United States of The Gulf Between, the first film made in Technicolor System 1, a two-color process.
November 9 – World's first feature-length animated film is made in Argentina by Quirino Cristiani (El Apóstol)
December 18 – Foundation of Universum Film AG (UƒA), as a propaganda film company, in Berlin.
Movette, another revision of the 17.5 mm film format, is made available.

Top-grossing films (U.S.)

Notable films released in 1917
United States unless stated

January 8 – Great Expectations, starring Jack Pickford
January 22 – Easy Street, starring Charlie Chaplin, Edna Purviance
January 22 – Her Right to Live, directed by Paul Scardon, starring Peggy Hyland, Antonio Moreno, Mae Costello, John S. Robertson
January 29 – A Man There Was (Terje Vigen), directed by Victor Sjöström – (Sweden)
February 2 – The Marriage of Luise Rohrbach, directed by Rudolf Biebrach, starring Henny Porten, Emil Jannings – (Germany)
February 18 – The Bad Boy, starring Robert Harron, Mildred Harris, Colleen Moore
March 3 – The Tornado, directed by John Ford (his debut)
March 5 – The Poor Little Rich Girl, starring Mary Pickford
March 7 – The Torture of Silence (Mater Dolorosa), directed by Abel Gance – (France)
April 15 – Teddy at the Throttle, a Keystone comedy starring Gloria Swanson
April 16 – The Cure, a Charlie Chaplin short.
April 23 – The Butcher Boy, starring "Fatty" Arbuckle with Buster Keaton
May 7 – Kidnapped, directed by Alan Crosland, starring Raymond McKee, Joseph Burke, and Ray Hallor
May 14 – A Romance of the Redwoods, directed by Cecil B. DeMille, starring Mary Pickford
May 19 – One Law for Both directed by Ivan Abramson
May 20 – Souls Triumphant, starring Lillian Gish
May 21 – A Reckless Romeo, a 'Fatty' Arbuckle short.
May – Frank Hansen's Fortune directed by Viggo Larsen – (Germany)
June 17 – The Immigrant, starring Charlie Chaplin and Edna Purviance
June 24 – Wild and Woolly, starring Douglas Fairbanks
June 25 – A Kentucky Cinderella, starring Ruth Clifford
June 25 – The Rough House, a 'Fatty' Arbuckle / Buster Keaton short.
June – The Labour Leader, directed by Thomas Bentley, starring Owen Nares, Fay Compton – (GB)
July 5 – Big Timber
July – The Picture of Dorian Gray (Das Bildnis des Dorian Gray) – (Germany)
August 12 – Golden Rule Kate, a drama western starring Louise Glaum
August 20 – His Wedding Night, a 'Fatty' Arbuckle / Buster Keaton short.
August 27 – The Little American, starring Mary Pickford; directed by Cecil B. DeMille.
August 27 – Straight Shooting, directed by John Ford
August 28 – Brcko in Zagreb – (Croatia)
August – The Gay Lord Quex directed by Maurice Elvey and starring Ben Webster and Irene Vanbrugh – (GB)
September 13 – The Gulf Between, All color movie.

September 22 – Rebecca of Sunnybrook Farm, starring Mary Pickford
September 30 – Camille, starring Theda Bara
September 30 – Oh Doctor!, a 'Fatty' Arbuckle / Buster Keaton short.
September 30 – The Sultan's Wife, starring Gloria Swanson
September – Fear directed by Robert Wiene and starring Conrad Veidt – (Germany)

October 14 – Cleopatra, starring Theda Bara
October 21 – Satan Triumphant (Satana likuyushchiy) – (U.S.S.R.)
October 22 – The Adventurer, a Charlie Chaplin short.
October 29 – Coney Island, a 'Fatty' Arbuckle / Buster Keaton short.
November 9 – El Apóstol (The Apostle), animated by Quirino Cristiani – (Argentina)
November 11 – A Little Princess, directed by Marshall Neilan, starring Mary Pickford, Norman Kerry, ZaSu Pitts
November 12 – Harrison and Barrison, directed by Alexander Korda, starring Márton Rátkai – (Hungary)
November 25 – All Aboard, a Harold Lloyd short
November 26 – The Silent Man, starring William S. Hart
December 10 – Tom Sawyer, starring Jack Pickford
December 24 – Bucking Broadway, directed by John Ford, starring Harry Carey
December – Raffles the Amateur Cracksman, starring John Barrymore

Other 1917 Releases
Bestia (aka The Polish Dancer), starring Pola Negri – (Poland)
Black Orchids (aka The Fatal Orchid), directed by Rex Ingram for Universal Pictures, starring Cleo Madison and Jean Hersholt
The Bottle Imp (aka The Mountain Devil) directed by Marshall Neilan, produced by Jesse Lasky, starring Sessue Hayakawa and Lehua Waipahu; this was the 2nd ever film adaptation of the Robert Louis Stevenson novel
Brand of Satan, directed by George Archianbaud, starring Montagu Love and Gerda Holmes
The Colonel (aka Az Ezredes), directed by Michael Curtiz, starring Bela Lugosi – (Hungary)
The Darling of Paris, directed by J. Gordon Edwards for Fox Films, starring Theda Bara and Walter Law; an early film adaptation of Victor Hugo's novel The Hunchback of Notre Dame
The Devil Stone, directed by Cecil B. DeMille, produced by Jesse L. Lasky, starring Geraldine Farrar, Tully Marshall and Gustav von Seyffertitz
The Devil's Assistant, directed by Harry A. Pollard, starring Monroe Salisbury and Margarita Fischer
Dombey and Son, directed by Maurice Elvey and starring Hayford Hobbs – (GB)
Le Cygne (film) ("Umirayushchii Lebed") – (U.S.S.R.)
The Enchanted Kiss, directed by David Smith for Vitagraph, starring Chet Ryan and a young Jack Pierce; based on a short story by O. Henry
The Eternal Sin (aka Lucretia Borgia), directed by Herbert Brenon, starring Florence Reed and Richard Barthelmess, based on the 1833 Victor Hugo novel Lucretia Borgia
Even As You and I, directed by Lois Webber for Universal Pictures, starring Harry Carter (as Satan), Ben F. Wilson and Priscilla Dean
The Fall of the Romanoffs, directed by Herbert Brenon, starring Edward Connelly as Rasputin, based on a book written by a monk named Iliodor (who also played himself in the film)
The Fatal Ring, a 20-chapter serial directed by George B. Seitz for Pathe/Aster, starring Warner Oland, Earl Foxe and Pearl White
Fear/ Furcht (German) directed by Robert Wiene, starring Conrad Veidt and Bruno Decarli;  this was the first time Wiene and Veidt worked together on a film
Flames (British) directed by Maurice Elvey, starring Owen Nates, Clifford Cobb and Douglas Munro; based on the novel by Richard Hichens
Ghost Hounds, comedy short starring Lloyd Hamilton and Bud Duncan
The Ghost House, directed by William C. DeMille (Cecil's brother) for producer Jesse L. Lasky, starring Jack Pickford (Mary's brother), Eugene Pallette and Louise Huff
The Ghost of Old Morro directed by Richard Ridgely for producer Thomas Edison, starring Mabel Trunnelle and Helen Strickland
The Golem and the Dancing Girl/ Der Golem und die Tanzerin (German), a lost 1917 parody of the 1915 film The Golem, written and directed by Paul Wegener, starring Wagner as the Golem and Lydia Salmonova as the dancer
The Haunted House, directed by Albert Parker, starring Winifred Allen, Richard Rosson and Albert Parker
Hilde Warren and Death (German) directed by Joe May, written by Fritz Lang, starring Mila May, Bruno Kastner and Georg John as "Death"
The Image Maker, directed by Eugene Moore for Thanhouser Films, starring Valda Valkyrien and Harris Gordon, deals with reincarnation
The Inspirations of Harry Larrabee, directed by Bertram Bracken, starring Clifford Grey and Margaret Landis, based on the short story by Howard Fielding
It's Never Too Late to Mend (British) directed by Dave Aylott, starring George Leyton and Margaret Hope, based on the political novel by Charles Reade
Kaidan Chibusa Enoki/ Ghost Story of the Breast-Nettle Tree (Japanese) produced by Nikkatsu Films, starring Matsunosuke Onoe and Kakumatsuro Arashi
Magia (Hungarian) directed by Alexander Korda, starring Mihaly Varkony and Lucie Labass; plot involves Baron Munchausen as a vampire
The Magic Girdle ("Der Magische Gürtel") (Germany)
The Man Without a Country, starring Florence La Badie
The Memoirs of Satan (German) directed by Robert Heymann, starring Kurt Brenkendorf and Friedrich Kuhne; a 3-chapter serial that relates the misadventures of Satan
Midnight, 11-minute short starring and directed by Allen Holubar for Universal Pictures, scripted by E.J. Clawson
Mothers of Men, starring Dorothy Davenport
Nabeshima Kaibyo (Japanese) a Ghost-cat horror film produced by Nikkatsu, starring Matsunosuke Onoe and Suminojo Ichikawa
The Picture of Dorian Gray/ Das Bildnis des Dorian Gray (Germany) written and directed by Richard Oswald, starring Bernd Aldor and Lupu Pick, based on Oscar Wilde's 1890 novel
Rasputin (German) directed by Herr Arno, starring Max Hiller and Fritz Holbauer
Rasputin, the Black Monk, directed by Arthur Ashley, starring Montagu Love and Henry Hull
Runaway Romany, directed by George Lederer, starring Marion Davies and Matt Moore
Saga no yozakura (Japanese) ghost-cat film directed by Shozo Makino, starring Matsunosuke Onoe
Satan Triumphant (Russian) directed by Yakov Protazanov, starring Pavel Pavlov and Ivan Mozhukhin
Seven Keys to Baldpate, directed by Hugh Ford, starring Geoge M. Cohan and Hedda Hopper; first American film to be based on the 1913 novel by Earl Derr Biggers
She, directed by Kenean Buel for Fox Films, starring Valeska Suratt (as "She") and Ben Taggart as Leo Vincey; based on the eponymous novel by H. Rider Haggard (a lost film today)
A Sleeping Memory, directed by George D. Baker for Metro Films, starring Emily Stevens and Frank Mills, based on the 1902 novel by Edward Phillips Oppenheim
The Sorrows of Satan (British) directed by Alexander Butler, starring Ceceil Humphreys and Gladys Cooper, based on the 1895 novel by Marie Corelli
Tangled Lives, directed by J. Gordon Edwards for Fox Films, starring Genevieve Hamper and Stuart Holmes, based on the Wilkie Collins novel The Woman in White
Thaïs – (Italy)
U-Boote Heraus! ("U-Boat Release") (Germany)
Unconquered, directed by Frank Reicher for Paramount, written by Beatrice DeMille, starring Mabel Van Buren, Tully Marshall (wearing blackface) and Hobart Bosworth
The Voice on the Wire, a 15-chapter Universal serial directed by Stuart Paton, starring Ben Wilson, Neva Gerber, Hoot Gibson and Nigel De Brulier, based on the 1915 novel by Eustace Hale Ball
The Woman in White, directed by Ernest C. Warde for Thanhouser Films, starring Florence La Badie, Richard Neill and Gertrude Dallas, this was Thanhouser's second film adaptation of the eponymous Wilkie Collins novel (he also produced a 1912 version);  the film was re-released in the early 1920s as The Unfortunate Marriage.

Comedy film series
Harold Lloyd (1913–1938)
Charlie Chaplin (1914–1940)
Lupino Lane (1915–1939)
Buster Keaton (1917–1944)

Births
January 2 – Vera Zorina, dancer, actress (died 2003)
January 3 – Jesse White, actor (died 1997)
January 5 – Jane Wyman, actress (died 2007)
January 10 – Hilde Krahl, actress (died 1999)
January 21 – Lally Bowers, English actress and singer (died 1984)
January 24 – Ernest Borgnine, actor (died 2012)
February 6 – Zsa Zsa Gabor, actress (died 2016)
February 21 – Lucille Bremer, actress (died 1996)
February 25 – Brenda Joyce, American actress (died 2009)
March 2 – Desi Arnaz, actor (died 1986)
March 12 – Googie Withers, actress (died 2011)
March 22 – Virginia Grey, actress (died 2004)
April 2 -  Dabbs Greer, actor (died 2007)
April 14 – Valerie Hobson, actress (died 1998)
April 17 – R. G. Armstrong, actor, playwright (died 2012)
April 29 
 Celeste Holm, actress (died 2012)
 Maya Deren, experimental filmmaker (died 1961)
May 1 – Danielle Darrieux, actress (died 2017)
May 5 - June Lang, American actress (died 2005)
May 7 - David Tomlinson, English actor and comedian (died 2000)
May 10 – Margo, actress (died 1985)
May 16 – George Gaynes, actor (died 2016)
May 18 – James Donald, actor (died 1993)
May 21 – Raymond Burr, actor (died 1993)
May 22 - Nathan Davis (actor), American actor (died 2008) 
May 25 – Steve Cochran, actor (died 1965)
June 2 - Max Showalter, American actor and musician (died 2000)
June 3 – Leo Gorcey, actor, comedian (died 1969)
June 7 – Dean Martin, singer, actor (died 1995)
June 30
Lena Horne, singer, actress (died 2010)
Susan Hayward, actress (died 1975)
July 1 – Virginia Dale, American actress (died 1994)
July 8 – Faye Emerson, actress (died 1983)
July 17 – Phyllis Diller, comedian, actress (died 2012)
July 26 – Lorna Gray, actress (died 2017)
August 6 – Robert Mitchum, actor (died 1997)
August 8 – Earl Cameron, actor (died 2020)
August 12 – Marjorie Reynolds, actress, dancer (died 1997)
August 13 – Gloria Dickson, actress (died 1945)
August 25 – Mel Ferrer, actor (died 2008)
September 9 – Rolf Wenkhaus, actor (died 1942)
September 11 – Herbert Lom, actor (died 2012)
September 18 - June Foray, American voice actress (died 2017)
October 7 
Helmut Dantine, actor (died 1982)
June Allyson, actress (died 2006)
October 11 - J. Edward McKinley, American character actor (died 2004)
October 16 – Alice Pearce, actress (died 1966)
October 17 – Marsha Hunt, American actress (died 2022)
October 22 – Joan Fontaine, actress (died 2013)
November 2 – Ann Rutherford, actress (died 2012)
November 4 – Virginia Field, actress (died 1992)
November 30 - Ilse Steppat, German actress (died 1969)
December 7 – Hurd Hatfield, actor (died 1998)
December 12 – Margaret Marquis, actress (died 1993)
December 13 - John Hart, American actor (died 2009)
December 18 - Ossie Davis, American film, television and Broadway actor, director, poet, playwright, author and civil rights activist (died 2005)
December 22 – Frankie Darro, actor (died 1976)
December 28 - Kim Chan, Chinese-American actor and producer (died 2008)

Deaths
 February 21 – Fred Mace, 38, American actor & comedian, What Happened to Jones, His Last Scent, A Lover's Might, The Love Comet March 6 – Valdemar Psilander, 32, Danish actor, Rytterstatuen, Lykken, Lydia, Klovnen, Favoriten, In Defense of a Nation, John Redmond, the Evangelist July 2 – Herbert Beerbohm Tree, 64, English stage & screen actor, Beerbohm Tree, The Great English Actor; Henry VIII; Macbeth; Trilby; The Old Folks at Home October 13 – Florence La Badie, 29, American actress, The Man Without a Country, War and the Woman, The Woman in White, When Love Was Blind October 25 – Jack Standing, 31, English actor, With Hoops of Steel, The Curse of Eve, The Innocent Sinner, The Price of Her Soul, One Touch of Sin 
 November 5 – Howell Hansel, 46, American actor and director
 November 18 – Nino Oxilia, 28, Italian director, Rapsodia satanica, Blue Blood December 20 – Eric Campbell, 38, Scottish actor, The Immigrant, Behind the Screen, The Count, Easy Street, The Adventurer(short), The Cure''(short)

Film debuts
 Ronald Colman – The Live Wire
 Jackie Coogan – Skinner's Baby (uncredited)
 Marion Davies – Runaway, Romany
 Vittorio De Sica – The Clemenceau Affair
 Richard Dix – One of Many
 Elsie Ferguson – Barbary Sheep
 John Ford – director, The Tornado (short) (as Jack Ford)
 Mary Garden – Thais
 Helen Hayes – The Weavers of Life
 Taylor Holmes – Efficiency Edgar's Courtship (short)
 Buster Keaton – actor, The Butcher Boy (short); writer, director, The Rough House (short)
 Stan Laurel – Nuts in May (short) (as Stan Jefferson)
 Bela Lugosi – Az ezredes (as Arisztid Olt)
 May McAvoy – Hate (1917 film)
 ZaSu Pitts – Uneasy Money (short)
 Marjorie Rambeau – The Greater Woman
 Loretta Young – The Primrose Ring (uncredited)

References

 
Film by year